"Love" is a song written and performed by John Lennon, originally released on his debut solo album John Lennon/Plastic Ono Band (1970). The song's theme is more upbeat than most of the songs on Plastic Ono Band.

Song
The song first came out on Lennon's 1970 album John Lennon/Plastic Ono Band. Lennon considered releasing it as a single, but was dropped in favour of "Mother". However, "Love" received considerable airplay at the time from stations who hesitated at playing "Mother". "Love" later appeared on the compilation The John Lennon Collection (1982), and was released as a promotional tie-in single for the collection. The single version is a remix of the original track, which most notably differs in having the piano intro and outro (played by Phil Spector) mixed at the same volume as the rest of the song; on the original album version, these parts begin much quieter and increase in volume. The B-side was "Gimme Some Truth", but labelled as "Give Me Some Truth".

Ultimate Classic Rock critic Stephen Lewis rated it as Lennon's 5th greatest solo love song, saying that "The close-miced vocals and delicate piano/acoustic guitar instrumentation increase the intimacy of the song."

An alternate take of the song appears on the John Lennon Anthology box set (1998) as well as the Acoustic album (2004).

The picture on the sleeve for 1982 release of "Love" was taken by famed photographer Annie Leibovitz on 8 December 1980—the day of Lennon's murder.

Like the 1982 British issue, the original version of the song was released as a single again in October 1998 for the Japanese market only with the Japanese edition of another compilation Lennon Legend: The Very Best of John Lennon. This song gained great success on Japan's Oricon chart and won the song of the year 1999 in Japanese gold disc prize.

The song was also used as Lennon's entry on the iTunes exclusive 4-track Beatles EP 4: John Paul George Ringo, released in 2014.

Personnel
The musicians who performed on the original recording were as follows:
John Lennon – vocals, acoustic guitar
Phil Spector – piano

The Dream Academy version

The Dream Academy covered this song on their album A Different Kind of Weather (1990), and also released as a single (CD, cassette, and vinyl formats are available). The single featured a strong Indian theme throughout (evident in the music video). The song samples the "Funky Drummer" drum break. Like the album it was released on, it received mixed reviews. Many critics and fans felt that they over-stretched it. The CD single included six different mixes of the song along with "Mordechai Vanunu", which was written for Mordechai Vanunu. A second B-side, called "The Demonstration", can be found on the UK CD single version. There are also exclusive remixes issued on the cassette and 12" single. As it turned out, this was the band's penultimate single and has an accompanying video that was shot in India.

Other cover versions
The Lettermen recorded the song in 1971. This single became a top 20 hit on the Japanese Oricon singles chart and hit number 42 on the US Billboard Hot 100 chart, becoming the only charting version of the song in the US and the last charting single of the group's career.

Barbra Streisand covered the song in 1971 on her album Barbra Joan Streisand, along with another Lennon composition "Mother". AllMusic critic William Ruhlmann described Streisand's "delicate reading" as a "gem."

Another cover was by Norwegian actress/model/singer Julie Ege.

The song was later covered by Vicky Leandros (on her 1970 UK album I Am), a guitar version in 1971 in various releases, an a cappella version on her US album Across The Water and a new guitar version with Roland Gabezas in 2005 "Ich bin wie ich bin"), Shirley Bassey (on her 1972 album I Capricorn), Kenny Loggins, Asha Puthli, The Mission and The Cure. Jimmy Nail's version, featured on his album Big River, was also released as a single on 8 December 1995 (the 15th anniversary of Lennon's death), and peaked at number 33 in the UK charts.

In 1990, Morgan Fisher, former keyboard player with Mott the Hoople, and a resident of Japan since 1985, recorded a version of "Love" for his album Echoes of Lennon. Yoko Ono read the lyrics over Fisher's ambient keyboards.

Italian artist Mango re-interpreted the song on the album Acchiappanuvole (2008).

American singer, songwriter, producer and multi-instrumentalist Beck's cover version was released in January 2014, and included in the 2014 compilation album Sweetheart 2014.

Track listing (John Lennon single)
All songs written and composed by John Lennon (except where noted).

1982 release
"Love" [remix]
"Gimme Some Truth"

1998 Japan release
"Love" [Album ver.]
"Stand by Me" (Ben E. King/Jerry Leiber/Mike Stoller)

Track listing (The Dream Academy single)
"Love" (Single Version) – 3:42
"Love" (Hare Krishna Mix) – 7:01 (appears on the compilation album Somewhere in the Sun... Best of the Dream Academy)
"Love" (Whales in Love) – 4:00
"Love" (Dream House) – 7:34
"Love" (Love is 12) – 6:52
"Love" (Love is 7) – 4:18
"Love" (Dreamstrumental) – 5:07
"Mordechai Vanunu" – 5:39 (written for Mordechai Vanunu)
"Love" (Trance mix) (an exclusive remix that only appears on the maxi-cassette single released in the U.S.)

Charts

John Lennon version

The Lettermen version

Jimmy Nail version

Certifications

Trivia
The song was used to accompany the closing credits of the Canadian 2021 film "The Guide To The Perfect Family."
The song was used during episode 12 of series 2 of Heartbeat, which was set in 1965.

References

External links
The Making of John Lennon's "Love" take-by-take song analysis
The Video of the Dream Academy version Hosted on VH1.com.

John Lennon songs
Song recordings produced by Phil Spector
The Lettermen songs
Barbra Streisand songs
Jimmy Nail songs
The Dream Academy songs
1970 songs
1982 singles
1990 singles
1995 singles
1998 singles
Songs written by John Lennon
Song recordings produced by John Lennon
Song recordings produced by Yoko Ono
Apple Records singles
Geffen Records singles
Rock ballads
Plastic Ono Band songs